Larry Fortensky (January 17, 1952 – July 7, 2016) was an American construction worker known for being the seventh and last husband (but eighth marriage) of actress Elizabeth Taylor. They were married in 1991 at Michael Jackson's Neverland Ranch and divorced five years later.

Early life
Fortensky, the eldest of seven children, was raised in Stanton, California, and dropped out of Pacifica High School in nearby Garden Grove during 10th grade.  He was drafted into the U.S. Army in 1972 and discharged three months later.

Fortensky married Priscilla Joan Torres in 1972, divorced in 1974, and had one daughter, Julie. He subsequently married Karin McNeal and they divorced in 1984.

Meeting and marrying Elizabeth Taylor
In 1987, he was convicted for driving while intoxicated. Police found him in a San Clemente, California parking lot "very intoxicated" and in possession of marijuana. Using Teamster medical insurance from his construction job, he checked himself into the Betty Ford Center in 1988, where he met Elizabeth Taylor. At the time he was living in a small house in Stanton.

Taylor and Fortensky were married on October 6, 1991, at Michael Jackson's Neverland Ranch. The wedding, which cost between $1.5 and $2 million, was attended by 160 guests and presided over by Marianne Williamson. It was a high-profile event with paparazzi helicopters buzzing overhead and a guest list that included Liza Minnelli, Eddie Murphy, and Nancy Reagan, as well as Franco Zeffirelli, Arsenio Hall, Pia Zadora, George Hamilton, Merv Griffin, Quincy Jones, and Macaulay Culkin. Taylor's $25,000 dress was a gift from Valentino. She was escorted by Michael Jackson and her eldest son Michael Wilding Jr. Their toast was with mineral water. Fortensky's best man was Taylor's hairdresser José Eber. Fortensky's family arrived in their own cars rather than limousines.  The couple donated money to AIDS charities from selling wedding photos.

In August 1996, Fortensky was arrested for drug use after police in Hemet, California, found him in an illegally parked luxury motor home with no license plates with a woman he identified as his live-in maid. Fortensky, whose black BMW was parked by the home's front door, refused to allow police to search the motor home, but he was arrested for being under the influence of drugs at the time.

Fortensky was reported to have a prenuptial agreement in which he would receive $1 million (with no additional support) if the marriage lasted five years. The couple separated after five years in 1996, with Fortensky hiring New York divorce attorney Raoul Felder. The couple was divorced on October 31, 1996.

Post-divorce
Fortensky fell down a flight of stairs at his home in San Juan Capistrano, California on January 28, 1999, and was hospitalized for two months during which he was in a coma for six weeks. He suffered short-term memory loss as a result of the fall. He was reported to have been drunk at the time, mourning the death of a prized pet.

He bought a three-bedroom house in Temecula, California, in 2002 with money from the divorce settlement. In 2009, Taylor reportedly gave him $50,000 to pay the $5,800 monthly mortgage payment and keep the house out of foreclosure.

Fortensky's last phone call with Taylor was a day before she entered the hospital in February 2011. She died in March 2011 and left Fortensky over $800,000 in her will.

Death
Fortensky died from skin cancer surgery complications on July 7, 2016, after 65 days in a coma.

References

|-
!colspan="3" style="background:#C1D8FF;"| Husband of Elizabeth Taylor

1952 births
2016 deaths
People from Stockton, California
People from Stanton, California
People from Garden Grove, California
People from Hemet, California
People from San Juan Capistrano, California
People from Menifee, California
People from Temecula, California
American people of Russian descent
American people of Canadian descent
Military personnel from California
United States Army soldiers
20th-century Protestants
21st-century Protestants